Budhanoor  is a small village in Chengannur taluk, in the Alappuzha District of Kerala state, India. It has 14 wards – Kadamboor, Budhanoor West, Budhanoor East, Budhanoor South, Ennakkadu, Ennakkadu North, Ulunti East, Ulunti, Elanjimel. Perigalippuram West, Perigalippuram East, Gramam, Tayyoor and Perngadu. Neighbor villages are Mannar, Chennithala, Pandanadu and Puliyoor.

Geography 
The climate in this village is moderate and pleasant.

Trade and Industry 
Budhanoor is known as a major trading center of compressed earth bricks in Alappuzha District. Budhanoor is also a traders place of dried Tamarind. Tamarind is a type of tropical fruit. Its a condiment flavor of many dishes in Kerala specially in fish dishes.

Education 
Budhanooor has long been at the forefront of literacy and education. There are many High schools and Higher secondary school. First secondary school has been established in 1910 name Budhanoor Government Higher Secondary School.

Sports 
Young Men's Association (YMA) is a famous Arts and Sports Club in budhanoor. This club started in 80's. A number of annual football tournaments organizing this club every year. Budhanoor village have a government sports stadium located near Shreekrishna Swamy Temple.

Centers of Worships

Kunnathoor Kulangara Devi Kshethram 
Kunnathoor Kulangara Devi Kshethram is an ancient temple located nearby GHSS Budhanoor. Goddess Durga Devi is the principal deity of this temple. Ten day festival beginning on Malayalam Calendar Medom 1 in every year named Pathamudayam. During the Pathamudayam festival the temple have full of devotees. The temple is also famous for the Pallivilakku which is held on the 10th day morning of the Pathamudayam festival. Pllivilakku is a big lighting system made many years ago with wood. It have more than 50 meter height and 100000 lamps.

St. Elias Orthodox Church Budhanoor 
St. Elias Orthodox Church is an ancient church in Budhanoor that belongs to Malankara Orthodox Syrian Church. Church was established in 1910. This church is situated beside the Mannar - Puliyoor Road and about a half kilometer from Aalthara Junction Budhanoor. The present church is the second church built in this location. The festival of the church celebrated during February 7 – February 14 is a symbol of thanks giving for all the blessings received through St Elias. St Elias is the patron saint of the people of Budhanoor and all those who seek assistance from St Elias.

References

External links
 GHSS Budhanoor

Villages in Alappuzha district